White's Slough is a rare Cypress swamp in northeast Mississippi close to Columbus.

References
http://www.nature.org/wherewework/northamerica/states/mississippi/press/press3313.html

Bodies of water of Lowndes County, Mississippi
Swamps of the United States